Liu Xing (born 17 April 2000), is a Chinese footballer who plays as a left-back for Hunan Mangguoba.

Club career
Born in Xingning, Meizhou, Guangdong, Liu was selected in 2013 for the Wanda Group's "China's Future Football Star" initiative, to encourage the development of young Chinese players. He started with Villarreal, spending four years before a switch to Atlético Madrid. He returned to China in 2019, joining Guangdong South China Tiger.

After two appearances in China League One with Guangdong South China Tiger, he left the club after it was disbanded. He joined fellow League One side Chengdu Rongcheng in September 2020. He was released in May 2022, without making an appearance for the senior squad, moving to China League Two side Hunan Billows.

International career
Liu has represented China at under-14 and under-16 level.

Career statistics

Club

Notes

References

2000 births
Living people
Footballers from Meizhou
Footballers from Guangdong
Chinese footballers
China youth international footballers
Association football fullbacks
China League One players
Villarreal CF players
Atlético Madrid footballers
Guangdong South China Tiger F.C. players
Chengdu Rongcheng F.C. players
Hunan Billows F.C. players
Chinese expatriate footballers
Chinese expatriate sportspeople in Spain
Expatriate footballers in Spain